San Miguel de los Noches was an Indian rancheria in Kern County, California. Its site is covered by the modern-day city of Bakersfield.

Franciscan friar Padre Francisco Garces visited San Miguel de los Noches on May 7, 1776. Father Garces named this site San Miguel de los Noches.

Today, the  Garces Memorial Circle is a testament of San Miguel de los Noches.

References

Former settlements in Kern County, California
Former populated places in California
History of Bakersfield, California